Daniela Akerblom is a Canadian actress who has appeared both on television and in films. She was born in Montreal, Quebec, and studied at Concordia University.

Filmography
 1984: Télévision de chambre: Sous le signe du poisson (TV) : Elsa
 1986: Sword of Gideon (TV) : Girl
 1986: Lance et compte (série TV) : Geneviève
 1989: Cruising Bar : Monique
 1991: Salut les musclés (TV - épisode 222)
 1991: Sous le signe du poisson (TV) : Olsa
 1992: Primary Motive : Announcer
 1989: Le Destin du docteur Calvet (série TV) : Sandy Leclerc (1992)
 1995: Disparu (Vanished) (TV) : Birgit Saunders
 1996: Snowboard Academy : Jessica
 1997: Liaisons scandaleuses (en) (An American Affair) de Sebastian Shah : Phyllis
 1997: Omertà II - La loi du silence ("Omertà II - La loi du silence") (feuilleton TV) : Lyne Levert
 1999: Kayla : Miss Washburn
 1999: Babel : Receptionist
 2000: Saint Jude : Drunk Girl in Club
 2001: Km/h (série télévisée) (série TV) : Femme allemande
 2004: Le Goût des jeunes filles
 2010: Mirador (série TV) : Femme de Ralf

References

External links

Canadian television actresses
Canadian film actresses
Actresses from Montreal
Living people
Concordia University alumni
Year of birth missing (living people)